The 1953 college football season finished with the Maryland Terrapins capturing the AP, INS, and UPI national championship after Notre Dame held the top spot for the first nine weeks.  The No. 4 Oklahoma Sooners defeated Maryland in the Orange Bowl, but there was no further polling after the November 30 results were released.   However, Notre Dame was selected as the National Champions by 10 other polls and the Oklahoma Sooners received first in two polls.  However, despite the team receiving National Championship rings, the University of Notre Dame does not recognize this title due to their policy of only recognizing AP or coaches' poll titles during the polling era (1936–present).  Maryland was also the first champion of the Atlantic Coast Conference, which had been formed earlier in 1953 by seven colleges formerly with the Southern Conference.   The year 1953 also saw the Michigan State Spartans, previously an independent, join the Big Nine Conference, which then became the Big Ten; MSU won the conference title in that first year and was the conference representative to the Rose Bowl, which it won 28–20 over UCLA.

During the 20th century, the NCAA had no playoff for the college football teams that would later be described as "Division I-A".  The NCAA did recognize a national champion based upon the final results of "wire service" (AP and UPI) polls.  The extent of that recognition came in the form of acknowledgment in the annual NCAA Football Guide of the "unofficial" national champions.  The AP poll in 1953 consisted of the votes of as many as 378 sportswriters.

Though not all writers voted in every poll, each would give their opinion of the twenty best teams.  Under a point system of 20 points for first place, 19 for second, etc., the "overall" ranking was determined.  Although the rankings were based on the collective opinion of the representative sportswriters, the teams that remained "unbeaten and untied" were generally ranked higher than those that had not.  A defeat, even against a strong opponent, tended to cause a team to drop in the rankings, and a team with two or more defeats was unlikely to remain in the Top 20.  Generally, the top teams played on New Year's Day in the four major postseason bowl games: the Rose Bowl (near Los Angeles at Pasadena), the Sugar Bowl (New Orleans), the Orange Bowl (Miami), and the Cotton Bowl (Dallas).

Conference and program changes

Conference changes
Three conferences began play in 1953:
Atlantic Coast Conference – an active NCAA Division I FBS conference; formed by seven former members of the Southern Conference with an eighth member, Virginia added in December 1953
Eastern Intercollegiate Conference – active through the 1959 season
Prairie College Conference – active through the 1967 season
One conference changed its name in 1953:
With the addition of independent Michigan State, the Intercollegiate Conference of Faculty Representatives (commonly the Big Nine Conference) once again became the Big Ten Conference (the league had 10 members before Chicago's departure in 1946). The Big Ten name was not officially adopted until 1987.

Membership changes

September
In the preseason poll released on September 14, 1953, Notre Dame was rated first, followed by the defending champion, Michigan State, Georgia Tech, UCLA, and Alabama.  As the regular season progressed, a new poll would be issued on the Monday following the weekend's games.

In a Friday night game at Los Angeles, No. 4 UCLA beat Oregon State 41–0.  Meanwhile, at Montgomery, AL, No. 5 Alabama was shocked by Southern Mississippi, 25–19.  The next day, September 19 No. 3 Georgia Tech beat Davidson, 53–0.  Notre Dame and Michigan State began their seasons the following week.

On September 26  No. 1 Notre Dame won 28–21 at No. 6 Oklahoma.  No. 2 Michigan State won at Iowa, 21–7.  No. 3 Georgia Tech went to No. 15 Florida and was held to a 0–0 tie.  No. 4 UCLA beat Kansas 19–7.  Still at No. 5, Alabama, trying to salvage some respect against a second unranked opponent, went to 0–1–1 after a 7–7 tie against LSU in Mobile; in the poll that followed, the Crimson Tide fell completely out of the Top 20.  No. 9 Maryland, which had won 52–0 at Washington and Lee, rose to third, and previously unranked Michigan (a 50–0 victor over Washington), entered the poll at fourth. The top five were No. 1 Notre Dame, No. 2 Michigan State, No. 3 Maryland, No. 4 Michigan, and No. 5 UCLA.

October
October 3 With the exception of No. 4 Michigan, which beat Tulane 26–7 at home, the other top teams won on the road: No. 1 Notre Dame at Purdue, 37–7,  No. 2 Michigan State at Minnesota 21–0, No. 3 Maryland at Clemson, 20–0, and No. 5 UCLA defeated Oregon 12–0 in an away game.  No. 6 Ohio State, which won 33–19 at California, rose to third in the next poll, knocking UCLA down to sixth.  The Big Ten had three of the spots in the top five: No. 1 Notre Dame, No. 2 Michigan State, No. 3 Ohio State, No. 4 Maryland, and No. 5 Michigan.

October 10   No. 1 Notre Dame was idle, but stayed at No. 1 after No. 2 Michigan State's 26–19 win over TCU.  No. 4 Maryland won 40–13 over Georgia and No. 5 Michigan edged Iowa 14–13.  The night before, No. 3 Ohio State had lost 40–21 to Illinois, while No. 6 UCLA returned to the top bracket with a 13–0 win over visiting Wisconsin.  The next poll: No. 1 Notre Dame, No. 2 Michigan State, No. 3 Maryland, No. 4 UCLA, and No. 5 Michigan.

October 17  No. 1 Notre Dame beat No. 15 Pittsburgh 23–14.  No. 2 Michigan State defeated Indiana 47–18.  No. 3 Maryland won 26–0 at North Carolina.  No. 4 UCLA lost at Stanford, 21–20.
No. 5 Michigan beat Northwestern 20–12.  No. 6 Georgia Tech, which beat Auburn 36–6, took UCLA's place in the next poll: No. 1 Notre Dame, No. 2 Michigan State, No. 3 Maryland, No. 4 Georgia Tech, and No. 5 Michigan.

October 24 No. 1 Notre Dame stayed unbeaten with a 27–14 win over No. 4 Georgia Tech.
No. 2 Michigan State lost 6–0 at Purdue and No. 5 Michigan lost at Minnesota 22–0.
No. 3 Maryland won a Friday game at Miami, 30–0.  Coming into the Top Five were No. 6 Baylor (14–13 over No. 15 Texas A&M), No. 7 Illinois (20–13 over Syracuse), and No. 8 West Virginia (52–20 over VMI).  The next poll: No. 1 Notre Dame, No. 2 Maryland, No. 3 Baylor, No. 4 Illinois, and No. 5 West Virginia.

October 31 No. 1 Notre Dame beat No. 20 Navy 38–7. No. 2 Maryland beat South Carolina 24–6.
No. 3 Baylor beat TCU 25–7.  No. 4 Illinois defeated Purdue 21–0. No. 5 West Virginia won at Penn State 20–19.  No. 6 Michigan State, which beat Oregon State 34–6, rose to fifth.  The next poll: No. 1 Notre Dame, No. 2 Maryland, No. 3.Baylor, No. 4 Illinois, and No. 5 Michigan State.

November
November 7  No. 1 Notre Dame won 28–20 at Penn.  No. 2 Maryland beat George Washington University 27–6 at a game in Washington, DC. No. 3 Baylor lost at No. 19 Texas, 21–20.  No. 4 Illinois beat No. 17 Michigan 9–3.  No. 5 Michigan State won 28–13 at No. 16 Ohio State, and No. 6 Georgia Tech beat Clemson 20–7. The next poll featured No. 1 Notre Dame, No. 2 Maryland, No. 3 Illinois, No. 4 Michigan State, and No. 5 Georgia Tech.

November 14 No. 1 Notre Dame won at North Carolina, 34–14, and No. 2 Maryland beat No. 11 Mississippi 38–0 as both stayed unbeaten and untied.  No. 4 Michigan State beat Michigan 14–6.  On the other hand, No. 3 Illinois lost to Wisconsin, 34–7 and No. 5 Georgia Tech fell 13–6 to Alabama in a game at Birmingham.  Returning to the Top Five to take their place were No. 6 Oklahoma and No. 7 UCLA, which had defeated Iowa State (47–0) and Washington (22–6), respectively. The next ranking was No. 1 Notre Dame, No. 2 Maryland, No. 3 Michigan State, No. 4 Oklahoma, and No. 5 UCLA.

November 21 Number one since the season began, No. 1 Notre Dame played to a 14–14 tie with No. 20 Iowa in a controversial game where Notre Dame's players were accused of faking injuries to stop the clock and gain time for a final touchdown.  No. 2 Maryland closed its season with a 21–0 win over No. 11 Alabama to finish the season unbeaten and untied at 10–0–0.  No. 3 Michigan State  closed with a 21–15 win over Marquette.  No. 4 Oklahoma beat Nebraska 30–7, and No. 5 UCLA beat No. 9 USC, 13–0. The next poll featured No. 1 Maryland, No. 2 Notre Dame, No. 3 Michigan State, No. 4 Oklahoma, and No. 5 UCLA.

November 28 The new No. 1, Maryland had already finished its season.  No. 2 Notre Dame, with a 48–14 win at No. 20 USC, and No. 4 Oklahoma (42–7 over Oklahoma A&M) were the only Top Five members who hadn't closed their seasons.

November 30 The final AP Poll ranked Maryland, the only unbeaten and untied team, No. 1 with 187 first place votes. Unbeaten, once-tied, and one-game-left-to-play No. 2 Notre Dame received 141 votes.

December 5 Notre Dame beat visiting SMU 40–14. No additional AP Poll was taken because there were few other games played this Saturday.

ACC member Maryland would accept a bid to the Orange Bowl to meet once-beaten (8–1–1), Big 7 champ, and No. 4 Oklahoma, while No. 3 Michigan State and No. 5 UCLA would meet in the Rose Bowl.  Notre Dame declined to participate in a postseason game.

Postseason
After the AP National Champion Maryland lost in the Orange Bowl, there was a lot of controversy since the AP Poll had been finalized beforehand and could not be changed to take this result into account. This Maryland loss resulted in Notre Dame being ranked No. 1 by 10 polls, including Billingsley , Boand, DeVold, Dunkel, National Championship Foundation, Williamson, and several others. As a reward for beating the Terrapins, the Sooners received No. 1 from Berryman and Football Research.

Conference standings

Major conference standings

Independents

Minor conferences

Minor conference standings

Rankings

Bowl games

Heisman Trophy voting
The Heisman Trophy is given to the year's most outstanding player

Source:

See also
 1953 College Football All-America Team

References